UBC Exchange (formerly known as UBC Loop) is a major public transit exchange point in the University Endowment Lands adjacent to Vancouver, British Columbia, Canada. The first major bus loop located at the University of British Columbia (UBC) opened in September 1945 to serve students, staff, and faculty.

History
On September 5, 1988, trolley wires were extended to the loop providing the University with trolley bus service for the first time.

In 2003, the campus opened two temporary loops used by TransLink buses travelling to and from UBC: the south loop (used mainly for trolley buses) and the north loop. These temporary loops replaced the old bus loop to make room for a proposed new underground bus loop that was ultimately never built.

The new underground bus loop was slated to be built beside the Student Union Building, on the site of a small mound called the "Grassy Knoll", which was set to be removed to make way for the new loop. This plan was unpopular with a number of UBC students. Several students were arrested after a protest in support of the knoll was shut down by the police in April 2008.

On October 27, 2009, the University announced in an open letter that, because Translink was no longer committing $10 million toward the $50 million underground loop project, a surface loop would be built instead.

On July 9, 2014, it was announced that due to construction of the new UBC Aquatic Centre starting on MacInnes Field, pedestrian and cyclist access to the bus loop would be restricted, and several stops would be temporarily moved. It was estimated the construction would be completed in 2016.

In March 2017, all diesel bus stops in the former north loop were relocated to Wesbrook Mall for the duration of construction of the new UBC Exchange. Construction was completed in late August 2019 at a cost of $22million. LED departure signs were installed and became operational in December 2021.

Routes

The following routes terminate at UBC Exchange.

North bus loop
The north loop, serving most diesel and hybrid bus routes, is surrounded by MacInnes Field to its west, the Aquatic Centre to its north, and the War Memorial Gym to its south. The loop is partially underneath the Exchange residence located on the west side of Wesbrook Mall.

South bus loop
  
The south loop, serving trolley buses and limited-service diesel buses, is located on University Boulevard west of Wesbrook Mall.

References

External links

UBC Exchange map (PDF file)

TransLink (British Columbia) bus stations
University Endowment Lands